Sahar Zohouri (born 1986) is an Iranian professional darts player. She is the first Iranian dart player ever to win a medal.

Career
Sahar Zohouri won a silver medal at WDF Asia-Pacific Cup women's singles in Kuala Lumpur (2006).
She ranked first at the Iranian women darts championship in 2008.

References

External links
Sahar Zohouri
Sahar Zohouri's overview of results and achievements in the World Darts Federation (WDF)

Living people
Iranian darts players
1986 births
Female darts players
Medalists in darts